PC LOAD LETTER is a printer error message that has entered popular culture as a technology meme referring to a confusing or inappropriate error message. The error message's vagueness was mocked in the 1999 comedy film Office Space.

The message is encountered when printing on older HP LaserJet printers such as the LaserJet II, III, and 4 series. It means that the printer is trying to print a document that needs "Letter size" (8½ × 11 in.) paper when no such paper is available.

"PC" is an abbreviation for "paper cassette", the tray which holds blank paper for the printer to use. These two-character codes are a legacy feature carried over from the first LaserJet printers, which could only use a two-character display for all printer status and error messages. "LOAD" is an instruction to refill the paper tray. "LETTER" is the standard paper size used in the United States and Canada.  Thus, the error is instructing the user to refill the paper tray with letter-sized paper. Other messages that might be seen include "MP LOAD LEGAL", meaning the "MP" (multi-purpose) tray needs to be filled with legal size (8½ × 14 in.) paper.

Users confuse "PC" with "personal computer", "LOAD" with some action you might do to that computer, and "LETTER" with a short document (in particular outside the United States and Canada, where most paper is A4 size, and users don't know "LETTER" is a paper size at all).

The error can be fixed (other than by filling the paper tray) by emptying the print queue and printer buffer or pressing "Shift+Continue" and, in extreme cases, restarting the printer and repeating. The LaserJet 5 introduced a "GO" button to override the warning message.

The LaserJet 5, 4000, and later models added number labels on paper trays and displayed a new message, "TRAY [x] LOAD PLAIN [paper size]" where [x] is the tray number.

See also

Abort, Retry, Fail?
Bad command or file name
lp0 on fire

References 

Computer error messages
Computer humor
Computer printers
Internet memes
HP LaserJet printers